HMS Dwarf was launched in 1840 as the mercantile Mermaid. The Royal Navy purchased her in 1843 as the Navy's first screw-propelled vessel. She was broken up in 1853.

Mermaid
Mermaid was an iron vessel built at Blackwall for mercantile use. She was fitted with Bennet Woodcroft's patent varying pitch screw propeller.

She was of 164 tons, and her mean draught on her trial trip was only .

HMS Dwarf
The British Admiralty purchased Mermaid from J. and G. Rennie, Holland Street, Blackfriars, on 22 June 1843, according to Sir George Cockburn's advice, and on the condition that she should steam  (7 March 1842). The Navy renamed her HMS Dwarf.

Dwarf underwent trials on 15 May 1843. Over six runs she achieved a mean speed of 12.142 miles. The results of her extensive propeller trials were published in December 1844.

Prince Albert while on board HMY Victoria and Albert at Cowes in October 1844 professed interest in the little screw and came on board with Queen Victoria for a closer look.

In December 1845, Dwarf was sent to Sheerness to take on the duties of that port's admirals' tender.

Lieutenant Osborne, when in command of Dwarf on the coast of Ireland in 1848, fitting out in the Portsmouth Basin, heard the cry of "a boy overboard," he immediately plunged in with his full uniform on, including his sword, and saved the boy. A first-class certificate was awarded, and he was strongly recommended to the Parent Society in London.

Dwarf, while moored in Kingstown Harbour, Ireland, sent an armed boat's crew to Ann Kenney  and captured an unrecognised emerald silk flag.

Dwarf was severely damaged. Her crew were taken off by Trident, which towed her into Kinsale, County Cork for repairs.

Fate
Dwarf was scrapped in 1853.

The second screw vessel in the Royal Navy was  a paddle vessel, built of wood and launched in 1842 as a tender to the Royal Academy, Portsmouth. Bee had additional screw propulsion fitted in 1844. She was broken up in 1874. Both vessels were purely experimental and never intended for active service.

Citations

References

External links 

1840 ships
Ships built by the Blackwall Yard
Experimental ships
Steamships of the United Kingdom
Victorian-era naval ships of the United Kingdom